Venezelos SA was a shipping company established in Athens in the 1960s. The company was managed by Nikitas Venizelos who became a prominent Greek politician. By 1965 the company had a mixed fleet of 11 cargo ships and oil tankers.

Rhodesian sanction busting
In 1966 they were owners of MV Joanna V, an oil tanker which attempted to break the blockade established to enforce UN sanctions against Rhodesia. On 7 February they chartered the ship, then called MV Arietta Venizelos, to Yiorgos Vardinogiannis.

References

Shipping companies of Greece